Ciliopagurus haigae is a species of hermit crab native to Tanzania.

References

Hermit crabs
Crustaceans described in 1995